Macbeth is a play by William Shakespeare.

Macbeth may also refer to:
Macbeth (character), the title character of Shakespeare's play

People 
 A family or clan member of the Beaton medical kindred or Clan MacBeth
 Macbeth, King of Scotland, the historical monarch on whom the play is loosely based
 MacBeth Sibaya, a South African footballer
 Ann Macbeth, a British designer
 David MacBeth, an English pop singer
 Don MacBeth, a Canadian jockey
 George MacBeth, a Scottish poet and novelist
 Henry Macbeth-Raeburn, a British printmaker
 James Cruickshank Henderson Macbeth, a Scottish and American chess player, code expert, writer and translator
 Jesse Macbeth, an imposter claiming to be an American soldier involved in war crimes in the Iraq War
 Nancy MacBeth, a Canadian politician
 Norman Macbeth, a British portraitist
 Robert Walker Macbeth, a British painter and printmaker

Operas 
 Macbeth (opera), 1847, rev. 1865, opera by Giuseppe Verdi
 Macbeth (1987 film), film version of the above directed by Claude d'Anna
 Macbeth (Bloch), 1910 opera by Ernest Bloch
 Lady Macbeth of Mtsensk (opera), 1934 opera by Dmitri Shostakovich
 Macbeth (Bibalo), 1989 opera by Antonio Bibalo
 Macbeth (Sciarrino), 2002 opera by Salvatore Sciarrino

Film 
 Macbeth (1908 film), directed by J. Stuart Blackton
 Macbeth (1909 French film), directed by André Calmettes
 Macbeth (1909 Italian film), directed by Mario Caserini
 Macbeth (1911 film), silent film starring Frank R. Benson and Constance Benson
 Macbeth (1913 film), directed by Arthur Bourchier
 Macbeth (1915 film), French-language film starring Séverin-Mars and Georgette Leblanc
 Macbeth (1916 film), directed by John Emerson
 Macbeth (1922 film), directed by H. B. Parkinson 
 Macbeth (1948 film), directed by and starring Orson Welles
 Macbeth (1971 film), directed by Roman Polański, also known as The Tragedy of Macbeth
 Macbeth (2006 film), directed by Geoffrey Wright
 Macbeth (2015 film), directed by Justin Kurzel
 The Tragedy of Macbeth (2021 film), directed by Joel Coen
 Macbeth (unfinished film), an attempt by Laurence Olivier in the mid-1950s to finance a film

Television
 Macbeth (1954 film), a live telecast film in the Hallmark Hall of Fame series, directed by George Schaefer
 Macbeth (1960 American film), a film in the Hallmark Hall of Fame series, directed by George Schaefer
 Macbeth (1960 Australian film), directed by William Sterling
 Macbeth (1961 film), a Canadian film directed by Paul Almond
 Macbeth (1965 film), an Australian film directed by Alan Burke
 Macbeth (1979 film), videotaped RSC production directed by Phillip Casson
 Macbeth (1982 film), directed by Béla Tarr
 BBC Television Shakespeare - Season Six - Macbeth (1983) directed by Jack Gold
 ShakespeaRe-Told, Macbeth (2005) directed by Mark Brozel
 Macbeth (2010 film), directed by Rupert Goold

Other uses 
 Macbeth (Jo Nesbø novel), a 2018 re-telling of the play commissioned by the Hogarth Shakespeare project and set in 1970
 Macbeth (Gargoyles), a fictional character based on both the historical and Shakespearean Macbeth from the Disney animated television series Gargoyles
 Macbeth (band), an Italian gothic metal band
 Macbeth (Taiwanese band), a rock band
 Macbeth (Bosnian band), a rock band
 Macbeth (album), an album by Laibach
Shakespeare's Macbeth – A Tragedy in Steel, a 2003 concept album by Rebellion
 Macbeth Footwear, a footwear company
 Macbeth (Strauss), Op. 23 (1880/90), a symphonic poem by Richard Strauss
 HMT Macbeth (T138), a ship
 Macbeth, the original name of the recovery ship SS Artiglio (1906)
 Macbeth II, winner of the 1888 Kentucky Derby
 "Macbeth", a song by John Cale from Paris 1919
 Macbeth, a fictional planet in the video game Star Fox and its reboot Star Fox 64
 The Tragedy of Macbeth Part II: The Seed of Banquo, a sequel in verse by Noah Lukeman
 Hamish Macbeth, main character in a mystery novel series by M. C. Beaton (Marion Chesney), and in the BBC TV series it inspired, Hamish Macbeth

See also 
 McBeth
 MacBeath (disambiguation)
 Lady Macbeth (disambiguation)
 Mac Bethad of Rosemarkie, a 12th-century Bishop of Ross

English-language surnames
Scottish surnames